Benjamin Vogt may refer to:

 Benjamin Vogt (poet) (born 1976), American poet and essayist
 Benjamin Vogt (politician) (1863–1947), Norwegian politician
 Benjamin Vogt (footballer), Liechtensteiner footballer